Winter X Games XVI (re-titled Winter X Games Aspen'12; styled as Winter X Games Sixteen in the official logo) were held from January 26 to January 29, 2012, in Aspen, Colorado. They were the 11th consecutive Winter X Games to be held in Aspen. The events were broadcast on ESPN. The following year, the Winter X Games were held in two international cities: Aspen, Colorado and Tignes, France.

Sports
The following are the events at Winter X Games 16.

Freestyle Skiing
Snowboarding
Snowmobiling

Highlights
Games dedicated to renowned freestyle skier Sarah Burke, who died on January 19, 2012, after a freak accident in training.
Mark McMorris and Torstein Horgmo landed the first-ever triple corks in the Big Air competition.
Heath Frisby landed the first-ever snowmobile frontflip in the Best Trick competition.
Shaun White's final run in the Snowboard SuperPipe final scored a perfect 100.00. White's victory also gave him the first-ever five-peat in that event.
Mark McMorris became the first snowboarder since Shaun White to win two gold medals in one X Games.

Results

Medal count

Skiing

Men's Slopestyle results

Women's Slopestyle results

Men's SuperPipe results

Women's SuperPipe results

Men's Big Air results

Women's Skier X results

Men's Skier X results

Men's Mono Skier X results

Snowboarding

Men's Snowboard Street results

Women's Snowboard Slopestyle results

Women's SuperPipe results

Men's Big Air results

Women's Snowboard X results

Men's Snowboard X results

Men's Slopestyle results

Men's SuperPipe results

Shaun White became the third athlete in Winter X Games history to achieve a five-peat. His 100-point victory run included a Double McTwist 1260 combo'd into the first-ever frontside double cork 1260. It was the first-ever perfect score in the history of SuperPipe.

Snowmobile

Freestyle results

Best Trick results

 Frisby won gold with the first-ever Frontflip
 Colten Moore won silver with a Tsunami flip
 Justin Hoyer attempted a double back flip, but under-rotated, fell over his handlebars, and broke his arm

References

External links
  Winter X Games XVI Page

Winter X Games
2012 in multi-sport events
2012 in American sports
Sports in Colorado
Sport in Savoie
Pitkin County, Colorado
2012 in sports in Colorado
Winter multi-sport events in the United States
International sports competitions hosted by the United States
January 2012 sports events in the United States